Tom Nelson (born December 4, 1986) is a former American football 
safety. He was signed by the Cincinnati Bengals as an undrafted free agent in 2009. In 2011, he played for the Philadelphia Eagles, in 2013, he played for the Chicago Bears, in 2014, he played for the Carolina Panthers, and in 2015 he played for the Baltimore Ravens. He played college football at Illinois State. Tom now owns a football camp and provides training for people of all ages.

Early years
Nelson grew up in Arlington Heights, Illinois and attended John Hersey High School, Thomas Middle School, and Ivy Hill Elementary School in Arlington Heights, IL. Nelson was a Chicago Bears fan during his youth.

Professional career

Cincinnati Bengals
After going undrafted in the 2009 NFL Draft, Nelson was signed by the Cincinnati Bengals as an undrafted free agent on April 30, 2009. His attempt to make the Bengals' roster was chronicled on the HBO series Hard Knocks: Training Camp with the Cincinnati Bengals. In his rookie season he had 25 tackles and an interception. He was waived on August 27, 2011.

Philadelphia Eagles
The Philadelphia Eagles signed Nelson to a two-year contract on December 5, 2011, replacing Colt Anderson who had torn his ACL. He was released by the team on August 25, 2012.

Chicago Bears
The Chicago Bears signed Nelson to a one-year contract on January 29, 2013. On August 30, Nelson was among the final roster cuts.

Carolina Panthers
On July 27, 2014, Nelson was signed by the Carolina Panthers. On August 31, he was among the final roster cuts.

Baltimore Ravens
On July 29, 2015, Nelson was signed by the Baltimore Ravens. On an unknown date in August 2015 Nelson was signed to a 1-year contract as a Wide Receiver. On September 4, 2015, he was waived by the Ravens.

References

External links
 http://www.baltimoreravens.com/team/roster/tom-nelson/ad0593db-b611-4b43-9fba-ff3562831be1/
Carolina Panthers bio
Chicago Bears bio
Philadelphia Eagles bio
Cincinnati Bengals bio
Illinois State Redbirds bio

1986 births
Living people
Players of American football from Illinois
American football safeties
American football return specialists
Illinois State Redbirds football players
Cincinnati Bengals players
People from Hoffman Estates, Illinois
Philadelphia Eagles players
Chicago Bears players
Carolina Panthers players
Baltimore Ravens players